Mochamad Yudha Febrian (born February 13, 2002) is an Indonesian footballer who plays as a left-back for Liga 3 club PSGC Ciamis.

Club career

Persik Kediri
He was signed for Persik Kediri to play in Liga 1 in the 2021 season. Yudha made his professional debut on 15 October 2021 in a match against PSIS Semarang at the Manahan Stadium, Surakarta.

Persikab Bandung
On 20 June 2022, it was announced that Yudha would be joining Persikab Bandung for the 2022-23 Liga 2 campaign.

Career statistics

Club

Notes

Honours

International
Indonesia U-16
 JENESYS Japan-ASEAN U-16 Youth Football Tournament: 2017
 AFF U-16 Youth Championship: 2018
Indonesia U-19
 AFF U-19 Youth Championship third place: 2019

References

External links
 Yudha Febrian at Soccerway
 Yudha Febrian at Liga Indonesia

2002 births
Living people
Indonesian footballers
Persik Kediri players
Association football defenders
People from Bogor
Sportspeople from West Java